Mary Jones (born August 25, 1986) is an American rower. She competed in the women's lightweight single sculls events at the 2015 Pan American Games and the 2016 and 2017 World Rowing Championships, and the women's lightweight double sculls at the 2018 World Rowing Championships.

References

American female rowers
Rowers at the 2015 Pan American Games
Pan American Games gold medalists for the United States
1986 births
Living people
World Rowing Championships medalists for the United States
Pan American Games medalists in rowing
Medalists at the 2015 Pan American Games